The 1975 North Texas State Mean Green football team was an American football team that represented North Texas State University (now known as the University of North Texas) during the 1975 NCAA Division I football season as an independent. In their third year under head coach Hayden Fry, the team compiled a 7–4 record.

Schedule

References

North Texas State
North Texas Mean Green football seasons
North Texas State Mean Green football